The Sucker is a French, Italian and Spanish comedy film by Gérard Oury starring  Louis de Funès and Bourvil.

Plot
 Leaving Paris for his summer vacation, the naïve Antoine Maréchal has his 2CV totally wrecked in a collision with the Bentley of company director Léopold Saroyan. As compensation, Saroyan offers Maréchal the chance to drive a friend's 1964 white Cadillac DeVille convertible from Naples to Bordeaux, all expenses paid. Unknown to Maréchal, Saroyan is the leader of a criminal gang and the Cadillac is filled with heroin, gold and precious stones, including the largest diamond in the world, the Youkounkoun. Maréchal collects the car in Naples from where, unknown to him, Saroyan and his associates shadow him. Unknown to Saroyan, an Italian gang are aware of the Cadillac's contents and are shadowing it as well.

After an accident, in which the repairman finds and removes the gold, Maréchal reaches Rome, where a pretty manicurist called Gina joins him. She only does it to make her fiancé jealous and then finds a pretty German hitchhiker called Ursula to accompany him. At night the Italian gang steal the Cadillac but are chased by Saroyan's gang, who capture it after a gun battle in which all the heroin is destroyed and return it to Maréchal. Mickey, one of the Italian crooks, seduces Ursula, who invites him to join them. In an isolated spot, Mickey then tries to kill Maréchal, but Ursula sabotages the battery so that he cannot make off with the car and saves Maréchal's life. Left on his own, Maréchal gets a new battery and throws the ruined one, full of diamonds, into the sea.

Crossing the border into France at Menton, Maréchal sees Saroyan's car being stripped by the police. He realises that the car they want must be the one he is driving and that Saroyan must be crooked. Heading for Carcassonne, he rings an old friend who is now chief of police there. Still tracked by Saroyan and the Italians, he lures them all into the unmarked side door of the police station, where they are arrested. Taking the Cadillac on the last leg to Bordeaux, he has another accident with Saroyan's prison transport, in which he finds the Youkounkoun and can thus expect a reward of 100 million francs coming to him. As they are being ferried to police headquarters inside the wrecked Cadillac, Maréchal and Saroyan begin to strike up a friendship over this misadventure.

Cast
 Bourvil as Antoine Maréchal
 Louis de Funès as Léopold Saroyan
 Venantino Venantini as Mickey
 Henri Génès as Martial
 Beba Lončar as Ursula
 Nino Vingelli as Tagliella
 Alida Chelli as Gina
 Lando Buzzanca as Lino
 Jacques Ferrière as a gangster, chauffeur de Saroyan
 Jean Droze as a gangster, complice de Saroyan
 Jack Ary as Customs Officer
 Pierre Roussel as Mario Costa

Reception

It was the most popular film at the French box office in 1965. As of 2019, it is still one of the 25 most watched films in France along with La Grande Vadrouille, another Oury–de Funès–Bourvil collaboration.

The film was entered into the 4th Moscow International Film Festival where the actor Bourvil won a Special Diploma.

References

External links

1965 comedy films
1965 films
Films directed by Gérard Oury
French comedy road movies
Spanish comedy films
Italian comedy road movies
Films produced by Robert Dorfmann
Films scored by Georges Delerue
1960s Italian films
1960s French films